Lepetopsidae is an extinct family of gastropods in the clade Patellogastropoda.

This family has no subfamilies.

Members of extant family Neolepetopsidae probably developed from Lepetopsidae.

Taxonomy 
Lepetopsidae belongs to superfamily Neolepetopsoidea according to the taxonomy of the Gastropoda by Bouchet & Rocroi, 2005).

Neolepetopsoidea was synonymized with Lottioidea so Lepetopsidae was moved to superfamily Lottioidea in World Register of Marine Species.

Genera 
Genera within the family Lepetopsidae include:
 Lepetopsis
 Lepetopsis levettei White, 1882

References